Bram van Vlerken (born 7 October 1995) is a Dutch professional footballer who plays as a right-back for Helmond Sport in the Eerste Divisie.

Club career
He made his professional debut as Jong PSV player in the second division Eerste Divisie on 28 February 2014 against Almere City in a 3–1 away win. He replaced Abel Tamata in the 64th minute. He is a former Dutch youth international.

Van Vlerken joined Almere City on 25 June 2018, signing a two-year deal.

On 12 April 2022, Helmond Sport announced that they had signed Van Vlerken on a two-year contract with an option of an additional year, starting from 1 July.

References

External links
 
 Career stats & Profile - Voetbal International

1995 births
Living people
Sportspeople from Helmond
Footballers from North Brabant
Association football fullbacks
Dutch footballers
Netherlands youth international footballers
Jong PSV players
Almere City FC players
Helmond Sport players
Eerste Divisie players